Bréhain-la-Ville (Luxembourgish: Leit-Bierchem) is a commune in the Meurthe-et-Moselle department in northeastern France.
Bréhain-la-Ville is including the Hamlet named Bréhain-la-Cour.

Population

See also
Communes of the Meurthe-et-Moselle department

References

Communes of Meurthe-et-Moselle